Abigail Lapell is a Canadian folk singer-songwriter, who won the Canadian Folk Music Award for Contemporary Album of the Year at the 13th Canadian Folk Music Awards in 2017 for her album Hide Nor Hair and again for English Songwriter of the Year at the 15th Canadian Folk Music Awards in 2020 for her album Getaway.

Based in Toronto, Ontario, Lapell released her debut album Great Survivor in 2011. In 2016, she won the Colleen Peterson Songwriting Award for her song "Jordan".

Hide Nor Hair, her second album, was released in 2017. In addition to her Contemporary Album win at the CFMAs, she was also a shortlisted finalist in the Contemporary Singer of the Year category.

References

External links

Jewish Canadian musicians
Canadian folk singer-songwriters
Canadian women singer-songwriters
Musicians from Toronto
Living people
21st-century Canadian women singers
Canadian Folk Music Award winners
Year of birth missing (living people)